The British Academy Television Audience Award was awarded annually as part of the British Academy Television Awards. The category was created in 2000 and was last reward in 2016, before being replaced by the British Academy Television Award for Virgin TV's Must-See Moment. It was the only award voted by the public.

Winners and nominees

2000s

2010s

Shows with multiple wins and nominations

Multiple wins
The following shows have been awarded the British Academy Television Award for Actor multiple times:

2 wins
Doctor Who

Multiple nominations
The following shows have been nominated for the British Academy Television Award for Actor multiple times:

5 nominations
The Great British Bake Off

4 nominations
Strictly Come Dancing

3 nominations
The Apprentice
Sherlock
The Vicar of Dibley
The X Factor

2 nominations
A Touch of Frost
Doctor Who
Educating…
Game of Thrones

References

Audience